"L'Italiano" (Italian for "The Italian") is an Italian pop song by Toto Cutugno released in 1983. It was his biggest international hit and is his best-known composition. The song was forgotten during the 1990s and was re-discovered when Toto Cutugno performed it live at a charity concert in Rome commemorating Italy's victory at the 2006 FIFA World Cup, creating a new wave of popularity for this song.

Recordings 
This song was originally intended for Adriano Celentano, who turned it down. 

In 1983, Finnish singer Kari Tapio recorded a cover titled "Olen suomalainen" ("I am a Finn"), which became a hit in Finland.

Also in 1983, a Dutch version titled "Als ik maar bij jou ben" ("As long as I'm with you") was a moderate hit for palingsound group Canyon from Volendam.

In 1984, Doron Mazar, an Israeli singer and Gassan Abbas,an Israeli-Arabian actor recorded a cover to this song, titled "Ani Hozer HaBayta" ("I am returning home").

In 1998, the Hungarian band "Happy Gang" made a cover titled "Sokáig voltam távol" ("I've been away for long") on their album "Te+én" ("You+me")

This song was copied by Indian music duo Sanjeev-Darshan for the movie "Mann".

In 2011, the song was released on the famous party band The Gypsy Queens eponymous album The Gypsy Queens. The song became a successful cover for the band when they released a video clip of the song (produced by Didier Casnati) featuring Italian actress Caterina Murino, and reached several million views on YouTube in only a couple of weeks.

Brazilian singer José Augusto recorded the song in Portuguese as "Faz de Conta".

French singer Hervé Vilard recorded the song in French as "Méditerranéenne".

Austrian-Italian singer Patrizio Buanne recorded his version in album "The Italian" in 2005.

Vietnamese singer Đàm Vĩnh Hưng recorded his version in Vietnamese as "Say Tình" in 2001

The Sicilians recorded a cover mixed by Dj Serg featuring Angelo Venuto and released on their album Un amore in 2004. It was played on Top 40 Radio stations as well.

In 2021 the couple Jonathan Cilia Faro and Annalisa Minetti record a cover of the song for the compilation Pro Latino 146 (DMC, DMCPL146).

Charts

References 

1983 songs
Sanremo Music Festival songs
Toto Cutugno songs
Songs written by Toto Cutugno
Number-one singles in Portugal